The 1929 National Derby took place during August with the final being held at Harold's Cross Stadium in Dublin on 22 August 1929. It was the second edition of the event. The race at this stage was considered unofficial because it had not been ratified by the Irish Coursing Club.

The winner was Jack Bob, trained by Yeats, owned by Miss P Harris and bred by Mick Lynch.

Final result 
At Harolds Cross, 22 August (over 525 yards):

Distances 
3 (lengths)

See also
1929 UK & Ireland Greyhound Racing Year

References

Greyhound Derby
Irish Greyhound Derby